Pan Yue (247–300), courtesy name "Anren" (安仁), was a prominent Chinese fu poet in the Western Jin dynasty. He is popularly referred to as Pan An (潘安) and was well known for his good looks from a young age. "Pan An" has become the Chinese byword for handsome men.

Pan's family was from Zhongmou (modern Zhongmu County, Henan). His grandfather Pan Jin was a governor of Anping (modern Jizhou, Hebei) during the Eastern Han dynasty, and his father Pan Pi served as governor of Langye (near modern Linyi, Shandong). Pan was known as somewhat of a child prodigy in his youth and was known throughout their village in Gong County, Henan for his keen mind and talent.

In late 266, around age 19, Pan moved to the imperial capital at Luoyang and served as an assistant in the Ministry of Works. Despite Pan's ability and handsome appearance, he was unable to advance his career for the next decade. In the early 270s, Pan worked as an aide to Jia Chong, a high-ranking official under Emperor Wu of Jin. By late 278, Pan had become completely disillusioned with official service and retired to the Pan family home in Gong county. Pan came out of retirement around 282 to serve as magistrate of Meng county (modern Mengzhou) north of the Yellow River from Luoyang. He returned to Luoyang in 287 to serve in official positions before being dismissed in 290 for an unknown offense. Around 295 Pan returned to the capital for a final time to serve under official Jia Mi. Jia was assassinated in a coup in 300, and Pan was falsely accused of plotting in a related rebellion against the throne. Pan and his entire family were subsequently arrested and executed.

Book of Jin had this to write about Pan Yue's looks:

His most famous works are his three poems to his dead wife.

References

Footnotes

Works cited
 

Jin dynasty (266–420) poets
247 births
300 deaths
3rd-century Chinese poets